LIV or Liv may refer to:

People 
 Liv (given name), a given name
 Liv (surname), list of people with the surname Liv
 Liv Morgan, a professional wrestler
 Liv, a person who speaks the Livonian language of Latvia 
 Titus Livius, a Roman historian

Media 
 Liv (TV channel), a Finnish TV channel
 Investigation Discovery (Latin America), a TV channel, formerly Liv
 Liv (band), a Swedish/American indie pop group
 Liv (Livingston Taylor album), 1971
 Liv (Waltons album), 2001
 Liv (film), a 1967 Norwegian film by Pål Løkkeberg
 Sony Liv, an Indian television network

Other 
 54 (number) in Roman numerals
 Law Institute of Victoria, Australia 
 Left innominate vein in the upper chest
 Lexikon der indogermanischen Verben ("Lexicon of the Indo-European Verbs")
 Line-item veto in law-making 
 Liverpool Lime Street railway station, England (station code LIV) 
 Wilder's law of initial value in statistics
 LiV DASH, a lithium-ion battery powered vehicle made by Hybrid Technologies
 Liv Glacier, Antarctic glacier from Barnum Peak and draining north
 LIV Golf, a professional golf tour 
 Low information voter
 Livonian language (ISO 639-3 language code) of Latvia 
 Liv Bicycles, a sub-brand of Giant Bicycles, designed specially for women
  (UCI code: LIV), a women's professional cycling team

See also
 Liiv
 Olivia (disambiguation)